A Gift from Above (lit. a gift from the sky) is a 2003 Israeli drama film, directed by Dover Kosashvili.

History
The dialogue on this film is partly in the Judaeo-Georgian language and partly in Hebrew. And since the Judaeo-Georgian language is a dialect, spoken by a small community, most of the cast had to learn it for this production.
The movie was a nominee to the Ophir Award in 11 categories.

Plot
The characters on this movie live like a closed tribe. Most of them live on the same block. Among themselves they speak a rare language. They put a lot of pressure on each other to get married only within their community. They are not much concerned about obeying the country's laws. And many of them work in the same place, Ben Gurion Airport luggage department, or help their community members, who do work there, to steal passengers' suitcases.

The community does not have a lot of money, but its folklore is rich and its life is full of parties, sex, violence and excitement. The most exciting happening there is the operation they're plotting, step by step, for stealing cargoes of diamonds from the airplanes. The plotting includes putting all the blame on two volunteers from within the community itself.

References

External links 
 "Matana MiShamayim" - The full film is available on VOD on the website for the Israel Film Archive - Jerusalem Cinematheque
 

2000s Georgian-language films
2000s Hebrew-language films
2003 drama films
2003 films
Films directed by Dover Kosashvili
Israeli drama films
2003 multilingual films
Israeli multilingual films